Yvette Barbra Hontiveros Almalbis-Honasan (born August 26, 1977), better known as Barbie Almalbis, is a Filipino singer-songwriter.

Formerly the lead singer of the bands Hungry Young Poets and Barbie's Cradle, she pursued a solo career in 2005, releasing her self-titled compilation album, Barbie: The Singles.

In 2006, she released her debut solo album, Parade. Her music is characterised by a rather quirky, but endearing vocal style, and guitar work.

Almabis is a capable guitarist in her own right and a painter; she is a born-again Christian and is married to Martin Honasan (the son of Sen. Gringo Honasan), a painter and scion of a Philippine political family. The couple named their firstborn Noa Stina.  Her sister-in-law is Kai Honasan who does keyboards and vocals on the band Autotelic. She is also cousins with Pia and Risa Hontiveros.

In 2016, she was chosen to interpret Nica del Rosario's composition "Ambon" at the 2016 edition of Himig Handog: P-Pop Love Songs.

Discography

Barbie: The Singles (2005)

By Hungry Young Poets
 Torpe
 Firewoman
 Panahon
 Maniwala ka
 Clear
 Runaway
 Radio
 Stars
 Deep
 Personal Flirt
 Rebirth
 Drowning

By Barbie's Cradle
 Tabing Ilog (soundtrack for ABS-CBN's Tabing Ilog)
 The Dance
 Goodnyt
 Shiny Red Balloon
 Belinda Bye Bye
 Dear Paul
 Money for Food
 Langit Na Naman
 Pangarap
 All I Need
 Limang Dipang Tao (by Ryan Cayabyab, first popularized by Lea Salonga)
 Everyday
 Idlip
 Independence Day
 Good Day (soundtrack for Nescafe)

By Barbie Almalbis
 Just a Smile (soundtrack for Close-Up's TV Commercial)
 Power over You (soundtrack for SkinWhite TV Commercial)
 You're My Number One (soundtrack for Nido commercial with Sharon Cuneta)
 "Summer Day (soundtrack for Sunsilk TV commercial).

Parade (2006)

 Dahilan
 Give Yourself Away
 Overdrive (first popularized by the Eraserheads)
 Damsel
 Sorry Song
 Parading
 Little Miss Spider
 High (duet with The Speaks)
 Summer Day
 Pag-alis
 For the World
 012 (with Rommel dela Cruz, Wendell Garcia, and Kakoy Legaspi)
 Credits Song

Barbie Rocks The Big Dome – Live (2007)
 Torpe
 Deadma (with Rocksteddy)
 Smile at Me (Rocksteddy)
 Tabing Ilog
 High (with Ney Dimaculangan)
 Just a Smile
 Majika (Kitchie Nadal)
 Firewoman (with Kitchie Nadal)
 Same Ground (Kitchie Nadal)
 Untitled (Harana Song)
 Dahilan
 Parading
 You Learn (with Mom)
 Summerday
 Goodnight
 012

Goodbye My Shadow (2011)

 Ostrich Cowboy
 Goodbye My Shadow
 Constellations
 Unraveling
 Always You
 No Police
 Lights
 Where Have You Been?
 Child of Mine
 Wait til Sunday
 Buntala

My New Heart (2014)

 Say Goodbye
 Emmanuel
 Run For Cover
 My New Heart
 Secrets
 Joyful, Joyful (Cover Music)
 We Are Slaves
 On This Train
 Ostrich Cowboy (2014 Edition)

Collaborations
 Tunog Acoustic (Warner Music Philippines, 2003) (with Barbie's Cradle)
 Supersize Rock (Warner Music Philippines, 2004) (with Barbie's Cradle)
 Tunog Acoustic 2 (Warner Music Philippines, 2004) (with Barbie's Cradle)
 Tunog Acoustic 3 (Warner Music Philippines, 2004)
 Ultraelectromagneticjam (Sony BMG Music Philippines, 2005)
 Tunog Acoustic 4 (Warner Music Philippines, 2004) (with The Speaks)
 Bandang Pinoy, Lasang Hotdog (Sony BMG Music Philippines, 2006)
 Kami nAPO muna (Universal Records, 2006)
 I-Star 15: The Best of Alternative & Rock (Star Music, 2010)

Greatest Day
A collaboration between Barbie Almalbis and Kitchie Nadal. The song was used for Unilever's Philippine TV Commercial of Sunsilk. The music video also featured both of them.

Rockoustic Mania
Barbie Almalbis and Pupil were chosen by Juicy Fruit as their advertising models to reach out to the younger generation in their Rockoustic Mania  advertising events. The promotion included Juicy Fruit's Tugtog Mo! band competition, and Style mo! competition by Human and Pony footwear. The collaboration between the two artists offers a fusion of Rock and Acoustic. The AVCD features two songs, the music videos and some behind the scenes look at the artists' works. It was released on August 24, 2006.

The Juicy Fruit Rockoustic Mania Final Fusion event was held on November 17, at the Tanghalang Francisco Balagtas (Folk Arts Theater), Cultural Center of the Philippines. The show featured performances from Barbie Almalbis and Pupil, guest bands Sugarfree and Up Dharma Down, and of course, from the three finalists, WTC 11, Medea, and 7th Skool. The band 7th Skool won the Tugtog Mo! Band Competition.

Audio:
1. Nakakabaliw (E. Buendia, D. Ventura)
2. Must Have (E. Buendia, B. Almalbis, D. Sergio)

Video:
1. Nakakabaliw (Directed by RA Rivera)
2. Must Have (Directed by Pancho Esguerra)
3. MYX News

Awards and nominations

References

External links
 12 Stone Records –  Barbie's management group and Label that works with Warner Music Philippines.
 Online Registry of Filipino Musical Artists and Their Works: Barbie Almalbis
 The Philippine Association of the Record Industry, Inc. (PARI)

1977 births
De La Salle University alumni
Living people
People from Capiz
Visayan people
21st-century Filipino women singers